Proscovia Margaret Njuki is a Ugandan electrical engineer and civil servant. Effective 24 November 2016, she serves as the chairperson of the board of directors of Uganda Electricity Generation Company Limited (UEGCL). She replaced Stephen Isabalija, who was appointed permanent secretary at the Uganda Ministry of Energy and Mineral Development.

Background and education
She was born on 25 June 1951 to Reverend and Mrs. Benoni Kaggwa-Lwanga. She attended Gayaza High School for her O-Level and A-Level education. She studied at the University of Nairobi, graduating with a Bachelor of Science in electrical engineering in 1974, the first female Ugandan to graduate as an engineer.

Career
Following graduation from Nairobi, she returned to Uganda and began work as a telecommunications engineer at the then national television station, Uganda Television (UTV). She rose through the ranks and in 1994, was appointed the head of UTV engineering services. In 1995, she was appointed Commissioner of UTV. Prior to assuming the chairmanship at UEGCL, she served as a member of that body, chaired by Dr. Stephen Isabalija.

Other responsibilities
She is a founder-member of the Association of Women Engineers, Technicians and Scientists in Uganda, since 1989. She is also a member of the Institution of Professional Engineers in Uganda and served on its executive council from 1990 until 1993.

Personal
In 1977 she married Samwiri H.K. Nnjuki and together they are the parents of two daughters and one son.

See also
Irene Muloni
Monica Azuba Ntege
Miriam Muwanga

References

External links
Website of UEGCL

1951 births
Living people
20th-century women engineers
Ugandan women engineers
Ugandan electrical engineers
Ganda people
University of Nairobi alumni
People educated at Gayaza High School
21st-century women engineers
21st-century Ugandan women scientists
21st-century Ugandan scientists